Zetterstrom is a surname. Notable people with the surname include:

Arne Zetterström, underwater diver
Dan Zetterström (born 1954), Swedish ornithologist
Hasse Zetterström, Swedish writer
Lars Zetterström (born 1953), Swedish ice hockey player
Magnus Zetterström (born 1971), Swedish racer
Rolf Zetterström (1920–2011), Swedish doctor
Ulf Zetterström (born 1958), Swedish ice hockey player